Positivism is a philosophy which states that the only authentic knowledge is scientific knowledge. Positivism was central to the foundation of academic sociology.

Positivism may also refer to:
 Logical positivism, a school of philosophy that combines empiricism with a version of rationalism
 Sociological positivism, a sociological paradigm
 Legal positivism, a school of thought in jurisprudence and the philosophy of law
 Positivist school (criminology),  attempts to find scientific objectivity for the measurement and quantification of criminal behavior
 Positivism in Poland, a  socio-cultural movement in Poland after the 1863 January Uprising

See also
 Postpositivism, a metatheoretical stance that critiques and amends positivism
 Postpositivism (international relations), a school of thought in international relations theory